"She's There" is a song written and recorded by American country music artist Daniele Alexander. It was released in July 1989 as the first single from her debut album First Move. The song peaked at No. 19 on the Billboard Hot Country Singles chart.

Chart performance

References

1989 debut singles
Daniele Alexander songs
Mercury Records singles
Song recordings produced by Harold Shedd
1989 songs